Frank Fenter (February 25, 1936 – July 21, 1983) was a South African music industry executive.

Fenter was the first managing director of Atlantic Records for Europe, where he helped discover and get signed to Atlantic late-1960s British Invasion groups, including Led Zeppelin and the progressive rock bands Yes and King Crimson.  Frank Fenter was also instrumental in introducing and breaking Rhythm and Blues music across Europe, with such artists as Otis Redding and Sam and Dave. He went on in the 1970s to be a co-founder, co-owner, partner and executive vice president of Capricorn Records, the label identified with Southern Rock, led by The Allman Brothers, The Marshall Tucker Band, Wet Willie and Elvin Bishop. In 2014, Frank Fenter was posthumously Inducted into The Georgia Music Hall of Fame.

Early career in London, England. 1958 to 1966
Frank Fenter was born in Johannesburg, South Africa, and moved to London, England, in 1958, at the age of 22, initially determined to become an actor.  Fenter's acting career included a feature role in the BBC's 1963 The Big Pull; in 1964, he produced, co-wrote and acted in Africa Shakes, the first South African rock movie, which featured Fenter's music act Bill Kimber and the Couriers. The movie was the first to have an interracial cast in Apartheid South Africa. 

While doing part-time acting,  Fenter began to book bands around London in the early 1960s, including The Rolling Stones, The Animals and Manfred Mann, long before they had recording contracts. Fenter got his first big break in the music industry in 1964, when he joined Chapell Music Publishing Co.; he went on to head Liberty-Imperial Record Publishing and later ARC/Chess Music.

Atlantic Records. London, England. 1966 to 1969
In 1966, Frank Fenter was chosen by Atlantic Records partner Nesuhi Ertegun to head the label in the United Kingdom. Within six months, Frank Fenter was the managing director in charge of Atlantic Records' operations in all of Europe. Fenter was responsible for making Atlantic Records "the most important American label in promoting British music", according to the late Ahmet Ertegun, co-founder and Chairman of Atlantic Records and The Rock and Roll Hall of Fame, who went on to say, "We wound up with quite a lot of British bands, due in large part to the fact that we had put Frank Fenter in charge of all Atlantic Records activity in Europe"  In Frank Fenter's capacity and role as managing director of Atlantic Records European Operations, he played a vital role in having brought Led Zeppelin to Atlantic Records and helped discover and sign such British progressive-rock groups as Yes and King Crimson.

According to Ahmet Ertegun, Frank Fenter was also "instrumental in breaking Rhythm and Blues music throughout Europe", having brought the legendary "Hit the Road Stax" tour abroad in the spring of 1967; the tour included the acts Otis Redding, Sam and Dave and Booker T and the MGs.  At the start of the European tour, according to renowned producer, Tom Dowd, Fenter suggested he record the live concerts and, with Frank Fenter's direction, Stax Records, a label affiliated with Atlantic Records, experienced a sales jump, with seven of the eleven albums recorded live on the European tour received gold certifications.

Capricorn Records. Macon, Georgia. 1969 to 1983
In 1970, Frank Fenter and Phil Walden, former co-manager of Otis Redding, Sam and Dave, and other Stax artists, formed Capricorn Records with a distribution deal from Atlantic Records. Working with Phil Walden and Jerry Wexler, Frank Fenter negotiated the Capricorn deal with his mentor, Ahmet Ertegun Frank Fenter and Phil Walden envisioned a new kind of record company structure that would be vertically integrated. Capricorn Records would have loosely held subsidiary companies that encompassed all facets of the music business, including artist management, with Phil Walden and Associates; a booking agency,  the Paragon Agency; a music publishing house, No Exit Music; and artist merchandising, with the Great Southern Company.

Frank Fenter took the helm of Capricorn Records while Phil Walden focused on artist management where they together pioneered and popularized the music genre known as Southern Rock. At the height of Capricorn Record's success, Fortune magazine, the business periodical, went on to recognize Fenter as a "Promotional Genius". Singly or together, the two partners discovered and signed such recording artists as The Allman Brothers, The Marshall Tucker Band, Elvin Bishop, Wet Willie, Sea Level, The Dixie Dregs, Jonathan Edwards, Billy Thorpe, Stillwater and Alex Taylor and eventually made Capricorn Records one of the most successful independent recording companies in America.

Capricorn Records declared bankruptcy in late 1979, but, in 1983, Capricorn Records was restructured and ready to forge a comeback, however, in the middle of negotiating a distribution deal with Mo Ostin, the chairman of Warner Bros. Records, Fenter died of a heart attack in the Capricorn office; and with his death, the deal with Warner Bros. fell apart.

References

External links
Ahmet Ertegun, Co-founder and Chairman of Atlantic Records and Rock N Roll Hall of Fame interview circa 2006 discussing the founding of Capricorn Records with Phil Walden and Frank Fenter. https://www.youtube.com/watch?v=zfC26KHTCQ4
New York Magazine, Article on The Allman Brothers and Capricorn Executives, Frank Fenter and Phil Walden, backing Jimmy Carter for President.1975.
Macon Telegraph, Obituary, on Frank Fenter, Capricorn co-founder's passing. July 21, 1983
Macon Telegraph feature article on effort to get Frank Fenter into the Georgia Music Hall of Fame. December 14, 2009 https://web.archive.org/web/20100106063410/http://www.macon.com/local/story/952458.html
Billboard,1976. https://books.google.com/books?id=FSUEAAAAMBAJ&pg=PT9&lpg=PT9&dq=frank+fenter,+new+york+magazine&source=bl&ots=omMdTgy4-O&sig=rdLnnqk4tKx3qcjP-42kMmxGZlY&hl=en&ei=BXwlS7ycE8bilAek2oGHCg&sa=X&oi=book_result&ct=result&resnum=4&ved=0CBUQ6AEwAw#v=onepage&q=frank%20fenter%2C%20new%20york%20magazine&f=false
Billboard Magazine, 1978.https://books.google.com/books?id=ZyQEAAAAMBAJ&pg=PT19&dq=frank+fenter&ei=KY0lS-m4AqLqygT80omnCw&cd=9#v=onepage&q=frank%20fenter&f=false
Associated Press, April 26, 2006
Atlanta Journal & Constitution, Frank Fenter, co-founder of Capricorn Records, Obituary. July 21, 1983.
Macon Telegraph, on The Capricorn Studio. November 2, 2009.
Hit the Road Stax/Volt Tour of 1967. https://www.nytimes.com/2009/01/03/arts/television/03soul.html
Alabama Blues Machine on Wet Willie. http://www.alabamabluesmachine.com/press_200810_01.html
Billy Thorpe Capricorn recording artist. http://www.morlingmanor.com/milestones/bthorpe.html
Rick Hirsch, co-founder of Wet Willie, website.http://www.ktb.net/~insync/index2.html
WNEW Radio Station. http://www.wnew.com/allman_brothers_band/page/2/
11 Alive TV. http://www.11alive.com/life/story.aspx?storyid=136993&catid=182
Macon Telegraph, 2009 on Paul Harpin and Le Bistro. http://www.iorr.org/talk/read.php?1,1091858
Capricorn Records BIO on The Marshall Tucker Band. https://web.archive.org/web/20091229030917/http://www.originalmarshalltucker.com/images/PDF/BIO.pdf
Georgia New Encyclopedia on Chuck Leavell. http://www.georgiaencyclopedia.org/nge/Article.jsp?id=h-3140
BBC's Big Pull,1963. https://www.imdb.com/title/tt1108041/
Article n Capricorn Records.Swampland.com.http://www.swampland.com/articles
Photo scrap book of Frank Fenter at Capricorn./view/title:the_legends_of_southern_rock_photo_scrapbook_part_six_capricorn_days
Article on Capricorn Records. Swampland.com.http://www.swampland.com/articles/view/title:capricorn_records_a_tribute
Book review of Music From Macon, by Candice Dyer. https://web.archive.org/web/20081120053219/http://www.swampland.com/reviews
Soulsville USA: The Story of Stax Records, by Rob Bowman. https://books.google.com/books?id=XLdsRwpZ9oYC&pg=PA118&dq=frank+fenter&lr=&ei=fY0lS6mKJ6K0zATEssmWDw&cd=13#v=onepage&q=frank%20fenter&f=false
Then, now and rare British Beat: 1960 to 1969, by Terry Rawlings.https://books.google.com/books?id=iDE0dH6ZLwUC&pg=PA80&dq=frank+fenter&lr=&ei=fY0lS6mKJ6K0#v=onepage&q=frank%20fenter&f=false
Taped conversation with Roger Cawles, former Paragon Publicity executive, on how Frank Fenter brought the band Yes to Atlantic Records.
Interview with Chris Squire of Yes mentioning their first manager, Roy Flynn, who also managed Speakeasy. http://www.classicbands.com/YesChrisSquireInterview.html
Interview with Peter Banks, founding member of Yes discussing The Speakeasy Club and their first Manager, Roy Flynn. https://web.archive.org/web/20071028232020/http://www.themarqueeclub.net/interview-peter-banks-yes
Email communication with Madeleine Hirsiger Carr, former Paragon Publicity executive, who worked very closely with Giorgio Gomelsky, former Yardbirds Manager, on how Frank Fenter brought Yes and Led Zeppelin to Atlantic Records.
"Africa Shakes", the movie.http://www.rock.co.za/legends/africashakes/africa_shakes_part3.htm
Africa Shakes", the movie.http://www.rock.co.za/legends/africashakes/africa_shakes_part5.htm
Street Singers, Soul Shakers, Rebels with A Cause: Music From Macon, by Candice Dyer. https://web.archive.org/web/20100410115808/http://www.streetsingersandsoulshakers.com/
Southern Rockers: Roots and Legacy of Southern Rock, by Marley Brant, https://books.google.com/books?id=Np-5yPcvnEMC&pg=PA98&lpg=PA98&dq=frank+fenter&source=bl&ots=QVu33-4WrN&sig=KvHvDT2Wz8M7Zm48q8bcw3v3MzE&hl=en&ei=YH8lS6nzBs7klAfr2eWKCg&sa=X&oi=book_result&ct=result&resnum=7&ved=0CCAQ6AEwBjgU#v=onepage&q=frank%20fenter&f=false
A Rock and a Hard Place, by Chuck Leavell. https://books.google.com/books?id=GiIGsH9hy2IC&pg=PA77&lpg=PA77&dq=frank+fenter&source=bl&ots=xG2WgdKM6v&sig=1tZQfIEamyMlqiFStuKiM1S2fAY&hl=en&ei=YH8lS6nzBs7klAfr2eWKCg&sa=X&oi=book_result&ct=result&resnum=2&ved=0CAwQ6AEwATgU#v=onepage&q=frank%20fenter&f=false
Midnight Riders, *The Story of The Allman Brothers Band, by Scott Freeman;
No Saints, No Saviors: My Years With The Allman Brothers Band, by Willie Perkins. https://books.google.com/books?id=MxAHFcWFlhIC&pg=PA43&lpg=PA43&dq=frank+fenter&source=bl&ots=PJUPQEiRVG&sig=cp2LMaP26Pizc0WxJ0grWeX3tE8&hl=en&ei=H38lS5yaLsqslAeFk8yJCg&sa=X&oi=book_result&ct=result&resnum=8&ved=0CB4Q6AEwBzgK#v=onepage&q=frank%20fenter&f=false
Fleur De Lys Circles, by Damian Jones. http://www.dysongs.net/lfdl/home.htm
The Allman Brother's documentary, Please Call Home. The Big House Years. http://www.thebighousemuseum.org/
Interview with the late Ahmet Ertegun, co-founder and Chairman of Atlantic Records, on Frank Fenter's role at Capricorn Records. https://www.youtube.com/watch?v=zfC26KHTCQ4.
 Interview with Phil Walden, former co-manager of Otis Redding, on the "Hit the Road Stax" Tour of 1967 and *Monterey Pop Festival" documentary.https://www.youtube.com/watch?v=R52G_xK9z08
Macon Telegraph article on Frank Fenter's legacy in the music industry and push to get him into the Georgia Music Hall of Fame. https://web.archive.org/web/20100106063410/http://www.macon.com/local/story/952458.html
TV news segment on WMAZ channel 13 on Frank Fenter's legacy in the music business and campaign to get him into the GMHF. http://www.13wmaz.com/video/default.aspx?aid=71761#/Son+Believes+Step-Dad+Belongs+in+Hall+of+Fame/61371830001
http://nl.newsbank.com/nl-search/we/Archives?p_product=AT&p_theme=at&p_action=search&p_maxdocs=200&s_hidethis=no&
Atlanta Journal-Constitution article on Frank Fenter's legacy and merit for Induction into the Georgia Music Hall of Fame http://nl.newsbank.com/nl-search/we/Archives?p_product=AT&p_theme=at&p_action=search&p_maxdocs=200&s_hidethis=no&s_dispstring=frank%20fenter&p_field_advanced-0=&p_text_advanced-0=%28frank%20fenter%29&xcal_numdocs=20&p_perpage=10&p_sort=YMD_date:D&xcal_useweights=no
Access Atlanta Magazine article on Frank Fenter's legacy in the music industry as Atlantic Records Managing Director and Capricorn Records co-founder and the campaign to get him into the Georgia Music Hall of Fame. https://web.archive.org/web/20100131041342/http://atlanta.creativeloafing.com/gyrobase/campaign_for_capricorn_s_frank_fenter/Content?oid=1302673
TV news segment on channel 41 NBC recognizing Frank Fenter's legacy as co-founder and partner of Capricorn Records and support for getting him into the Georgia Music Hall of Fame. http://www.41nbc.com/
Macon Telegraph announcement of Frank Fenter being Inducted into Georgia Music Hall of Fame in 2014. http://www.macon.com/2014/08/06/3236114/wet-willie-fenter-among-gmhf-inductees.html

1936 births
1983 deaths
People from Johannesburg
American music industry executives
Impresarios
Capricorn Records artists
20th-century American businesspeople